Amber Richards is a New Zealand set decorator. She was nominated for an Academy Award in the category Best Production Design for the film The Power of the Dog.

Selected filmography 
 The Power of the Dog (2021; co-nominated with Grant Major)

References

External links 

Living people
Place of birth missing (living people)
Year of birth missing (living people)
Set decorators